Iqbal Asif Jewel (born 1 March) is a Bangladeshi singer, songwriter, guitarist, composer and producer. He is currently a member of the band Miles and Artcell

Career
Iqbal's first band was Legend, whose first album was Onnobhubon. After the rest of the band left to continue their academic studies, he joined Warfaze, a rock band that was one of the first Bangladeshi rock bands to incorporate elements of heavy metal and progressive metal/progressive rock in its songs.

In 1999, Jewel joined Miles, a rock band formed in 1979.

As a solo artist, Jewel has released several albums including an instrumental fusion-rock album X Factor, and a collaboration with long-time friends from other bands; Jewel with the Stars.

Jewel has also produced or mixed several albums, including Sumon's first solo album Shopno gulo tomar moto, and Artcell's second studio album Aniket Prantor.

Jewel released a compilation album, Rock 101, in December 2008. In 2009, Eid al-Fitr Jewel released the dual Rock 202 and Rock 303.

In November 2020, Jewel released a single called Nilana Khobor (lyrics written by Iqbal Asif Jewel).

In October 2022, Jewel released a song called BijoyRoth from the album The Hybrid Experiment with Raef al Hasan Rafa.

Personal life
Jewel is married to Nazia and has two children named Eshan and Aarya.

Discography

Solo
 X Factor

Compilation albums
 Rock 101
 Rock 202
 Rock 303
Rock 404
Rock 505
Rock 606
Rock 707
Rock 808
Rock 909
Rock X0X

Mixed
 Jewel with the Stars

Miles

 "প্রবাহ" (Flow) (2000)
 "প্রতিধ্বনি" (Echoes) (2006)
 "প্রতিচ্ছবি" (Reflections) (2015)
Extended Play
 "প্রবর্তন" (Induction) (2016)

Warfaze

 জীবন ধারা (lifestyle) (1997)
 অসামাজিক (Antisocial) (1998)

Singles
Nilana Khobor (2020)

References

Living people
Year of birth missing (living people)
20th-century Bangladeshi male singers
20th-century Bangladeshi singers
Bangladeshi guitarists